Dmitri Vladimirovich Skopintsev (born 2 March 1997) is a Russian football player who plays for FC Dynamo Moscow. He plays as a left back or left midfielder.

Club career
Born in Voronezh, Skopintsev moved to Moscow as a child and began playing football in FC Dynamo Moscow's youth system. He also played youth football with FC Zenit St. Petersburg before moving to Austria where he played in FC Red Bull Salzburg's club system. Upon returning to Russia, Skopintsev signed with FC Rostov.

He made his debut for the FC Rostov main squad on 21 September 2016 in a Russian Cup game against FC Dynamo Moscow.

He made his Russian Premier League debut for FC Rostov on 29 October 2016 in a game against FC Amkar Perm.

He scored 10 goals for FC Baltika Kaliningrad where he played on loan in the first part of the 2017–18 season and during the winter break FC Rostov recalled him from loan.

On 20 February 2019, he signed a 4.5-year contract with FC Krasnodar.

On 7 January 2020, he returned to FC Dynamo Moscow, signing a 4.5-year contract. He reunited with Kirill Novikov, who coached him for 4 years while at Dynamo academy. In his third game for Dynamo on 13 March 2020, he scored the decisive third goal in the 3–2 away defeat of FC Akhmat Grozny.

On 8 August 2022, Skopintsev extended his contract with Dynamo to 2027. He was chosen by Dynamo fans as player of the month for November 2022.

Career statistics

Club

References

External links
 

1997 births
Footballers from Voronezh
Living people
Russian footballers
Russia youth international footballers
Russia under-21 international footballers
Association football defenders
FC Dynamo Moscow players
FC Zenit Saint Petersburg players
FC Liefering players
FC Rostov players
FC Baltika Kaliningrad players
FC Krasnodar players
2. Liga (Austria) players
Russian Premier League players
Russian First League players
Russian expatriate footballers
Expatriate footballers in Austria
Russian expatriate sportspeople in Austria